Broadway Line refers to the following transit lines:

In Brooklyn
Broadway Line (Brooklyn elevated) (rapid transit, now the BMT Jamaica Line); served by the  trains
Broadway Line (Brooklyn surface) (bus, formerly streetcar)

In Manhattan
BMT Broadway Line (rapid transit); served by the  trains
IRT Broadway–Seventh Avenue Line (rapid transit); served by the  trains
Broadway Line (Lower Manhattan surface), Broadway and Amsterdam Avenue Line, Broadway and Columbus Avenue Line, and Broadway and Lexington Avenue Line (bus, formerly streetcar) on Broadway below Times Square
Broadway and University Place Line, an older streetcar line using Broadway between Union Square and Times Square
Broadway Line (Midtown Manhattan surface) (bus, formerly streetcar) on Broadway from 42nd Street to 125th Street
Broadway-Kingsbridge Line (bus, formerly streetcar) on Broadway from near 169th Street to the Bronx
Broadway and 145th Street Line (bus, formerly streetcar) on Broadway from near 169th Street to the city line

Elsewhere
Broadway Line (Queens surface) (bus, formerly streetcar)
Broadway Bus (Bayonne), New Jersey
Broadway Line (Baltimore) (bus, formerly streetcar)